The Watter's Mou' is a novel by Bram Stoker, first published in 1895. It is the story of a woman who is in love with a man whose job it is to stop the smuggling by poor local fishermen, one of whom is her father.

Main characters
William Barrow
Maggie MacWhirter
Mr. MacWhirter - Maggie's father
Andrew MacWhirter - Maggie's brother
Niel MacWhirter - Maggie's brother
Solomon Mendoza - a money lender

Online texts
Bram Stoker Online Full text and PDF versions of The Watter's Mou'.

References

1895 British novels
Constable & Co. books
Novels by Bram Stoker